Allbirds, Inc. is an American company that sells footwear and apparel. The company claims to keep its products as eco-friendly as possible and is a certified B Corporation. Allbirds uses a direct-to-consumer model in conjunction with distribution via select additional stores, selling its products through its website and retail stores in addition to select Nordstrom and Dick's Sporting Goods locations.

History 

Allbirds co-founder Tim Brown got the idea for the company while he was vice captain of the New Zealand football team. He had previously attended business school and used to make leather shoes for friends but was aware of how uncomfortable they were. In 2014, he received a research grant from the New Zealand wool industry to engineer a sneaker. He then launched his idea on Kickstarter, raising US$119,000 in five days. After launching on Kickstarter, Brown teamed up with Joey Zwillinger, a biotech engineer and renewable materials expert. They began developing their process and officially launched Allbirds in March 2016. The name Allbirds is a reference to New Zealand having almost no native land mammals. It is a land of "all birds".

During their first year in business, the company raised US$7.25 million from investors including Maveron, Lerer Hippeau Ventures and other firms. In December 2017, Allbirds sued Steve Madden, alleging that the company's Traveler shoes look nearly identical to its Wool Runners.

As of 2017, the company had 50 employees in their headquarters in San Francisco,  US; 40 employees at its warehouse in Nashville, US; and 350 contractors in a factory in South Korea. In the end of 2017 the company launched in Australia. The company went public on the Nasdaq on 3 November 2021 under the ticker symbol BIRD.

Products 
The company launched with one product, the Wool Runners casual sneakers. The company has since expanded to offer other footwear, including running shoes and flip flops as well as apparel.

Allbirds has collaborated with other brands to produce limited edition products, including Outdoor Voices and Nordstrom. In May 2020, Allbirds announced a partnership with Adidas.

Further reading

References

External links

 

Shoe companies of the United States
Companies based in San Francisco
Kickstarter-funded products
Benefit corporations
2014 establishments in New Zealand
2021 initial public offerings
Companies listed on the Nasdaq
B Lab-certified corporations